Bamonte is an Italian surname. Notable people with the surname include:

Daryl Bamonte, English musician and artist manager
Gianluigi Bamonte (born 1984), Italian footballer
Perry Bamonte (born 1960), English musician

Italian-language surnames